Essex Street may refer to:

Essex Street, London
Essex Street, Manhattan, New York City
Essex Street station (NJ Transit), Hackensack, New Jersey
Essex Street station (Hudson–Bergen Light Rail), Jersey City, New Jersey
Delancey Street/Essex Street station, New York City subway

See also
Essex Street Chapel
Essex Street Market